"Casa Tomada" (English: "House Taken Over") is a 1946 short story by Argentine writer Julio Cortázar. It was originally published in Los anales de Buenos Aires, a literary magazine edited by Jorge Luis Borges, and later included in his volume of stories Bestiario.

It tells the story of a brother and sister living together in their ancestral home which is being "taken over" by unknown entities. It starts in a realist manner and it slowly introduces a scene in which natural laws are distorted. The mystery that revolves around what those entities are is largely left up to interpretation, allowing the genre of the story to vary from fantasy to psychological fiction to magic realism, among others.
Among the resources that are frequent in Cortázar's story, graphic signs (such as parenthesis) are used to reflect censorship. The writer based the house on one located in the city of Chivilcoy in the Province of Buenos Aires, which can still be found in the streets Suipacha and Necochea.

Plot 

A male narrator and his sister are introduced, both in their early-forties. Each has faced difficulties in their adult lives, the narrator having lost his fiancée long ago, and the sister (Irene) having denied two suitors who sought her hand in marriage. Inheriting their parent's house and wealth, they live a quiet, usually mundane, domestic existence.

The narrator describes the estate and the siblings' routine in great detail, describing their chores and interests; Irene knits all day, unraveling her work the moment it does not please her, while the narrator collects French literature and buys Irene wool during his visits to the bookstores.

Usually, their home is silent, but when one day the narrator suddenly hears something inside another part of the house, the siblings escape to a smaller section, locked behind a solid oak door.  In the intervening days, they become frightened and solemn; on the one hand noting that there is less housecleaning, but regretting that the interlopers have prevented them from retrieving many of their personal belongings. All the while, they can occasionally hear noises from the other side.

Eventually, the narrator hears "them" take over the section of the house he and Irene have been forced into. Hurriedly, the siblings escape the house and find themselves in the street, empty-handed. The narrator locks the front door and tosses the key into the sewer.

The source of the noises is never revealed, leaving the reader to wonder who or what has taken over the house and forced the sister and brother out. The story has been viewed as an anti-Peronism work, since Julio Cortázar had been forced to resign his professorship the same year the story was written.

References

1946 short stories
Short stories by Julio Cortázar
Works originally published in Argentine magazines
Works originally published in literary magazines
Argentine short stories